
Gmina Radłów, German Gemeinde Radlau is a rural gmina (administrative district) in Olesno County, Opole Voivodeship, in south-western Poland.

In 2008 the district was the first in Poland to put up bilingual Polish German signs for town names. These signs would celebrate the multicultural past of the region, which was prior to 1945 part of Germany and as of 2008 28 percent of the inhabitants were German origin.

Villages
The commune contains the villages and settlements of:

Radłów
Biskupice
Biskupskie Drogi
Kolonia Biskupska
Kościeliska
Ligota Oleska
Nowe Karmonki
Psurów
Stare Karmonki
Sternalice
Wichrów
Wolęcin

Neighbouring gminas
Gmina Radłów is bordered by the gminas of Gorzów Śląski, Krzepice, Olesno, Praszka and Rudniki.

References

Radlow
Olesno County
Bilingual communes in Poland